Somerset John Gough-Calthorpe, 7th Baron Calthorpe,   (23 January  1831 – 16 November 1912),  was a British soldier and politician.

Calthorpe was the fourth son of Frederick Gough, 4th Baron Calthorpe and  Lady Charlotte Somerset, daughter of the   6th Duke of Beaufort. He joined the 8th Hussars in 1849, rising to Brevet major by 1855. During the Crimean War he served as ADC  to Lord Raglan. Lord Cardigan sued Calthorpe for his eyewitness account of the Charge of the Light Brigade in his memoir Letters from Headquarters, Or Realities of the War in the Crimea, but the action failed. He became lieutenant-colonel in 1861, commanding the 5th Dragoon Guards. He was the first chairman of the Isle of Wight County Council, and was a JP both there and in his native Midlands.

Two years before his own death, he succeeded his elder brother Augustus (1829–1910) as Baron Calthorpe in 1910.

In 1862 he married Eliza Maria Chamier, only child of Captain Chamier RN and widow of Captain Frederick Crewe. They had  two sons and two daughters, including:
Somerset Frederick Gough-Calthorpe (1862–1940), who succeeded as 8th Baron Calthorpe
Admiral of the Fleet Honourable Sir Somerset Arthur Gough-Calthorpe (1865–1937), a Royal Navy officer.
Honourable Leila Maud Gough-Calthorpe (b. 1866)
Honourable Mabel Gough-Calthorpe

The Lady chapel at St John's Church in Oakfield on the Isle of Wight was built as a memorial to him in 1914.

Arms

References

External links
 

1831 births
1912 deaths
Gough-Calthorpe family
8th King's Royal Irish Hussars officers
5th Royal Inniskilling Dragoon Guards officers
Councillors in the Isle of Wight
Knights Commander of the Order of the Bath
English justices of the peace
7